Mount Hughes is a mountain,  high, midway between Mount Longhurst and Tentacle Ridge in the Cook Mountains of Antarctica. It was discovered by the British National Antarctic Expedition (1901–04) and named for J.F. Hughes, an Honorary Secretary of the Royal Geographical Society, who helped in the preparation for the expedition.

References

Mountains of Oates Land